Robert Robertson (born 31 March 1938) is a Rhodesian field hockey player. He competed in the men's tournament at the 1964 Summer Olympics. He also played in two first-class cricket matches for the Rhodesia cricket team.

References

External links
 

1938 births
Living people
Rhodesian male field hockey players
Olympic field hockey players of Rhodesia
Field hockey players at the 1964 Summer Olympics
Sportspeople from Durban
Rhodesia cricketers